Acinetobacter ursingii is a species of potentially pathogenic  bacteria. Its type strain is LUH 3792T (= NIPH 137T = LMG 19575T = CNCTC 6735T).

References

Further reading

External links
Type strain of Acinetobacter ursingii at BacDive -  the Bacterial Diversity Metadatabase

Moraxellaceae
Bacteria described in 2001